Damietta Governorate is one of the governorates of Egypt. It is located in the northeastern part of the country, and has a population of over 1 million. Its capital is the city of Damietta.

Damietta (city) is famous for its guava farms, as well as the palm trees that cover the coast from Ras El Bar in the east to Gamasa in the west. The governorate exports millions of palm trees to many countries every year, including Greece and China. Damietta also produces wheat, maize, cotton, rice, potatoes, lemon, grapes and tomatoes. It is also famous for its sweet industry, sardine packing, and Domiati cheese. Ras El Bar, one of the oldest summer resorts in Egypt, is located at the point where The Nile meets the Mediterranean Sea.

In August 2018, Manal Awad Mikhail was the first Christian Coptic woman to be appointed as a governor in Egypt.

Overview
An important feature of this governorate is the Damietta Port which has been able to accommodate the movement of ships when bad weather forbids nearby ports to do so.

Municipal divisions
The governorate is divided into the following municipal divisions for administrative purposes, with a total estimated population as of July 2017 of 1,501,963.

Population
According to population estimates, in 2015 the majority of residents in the governorate lived in rural areas, with an urbanization rate of only 38.7%. Out of an estimated 1,330,843 people residing in the governorate, 815,244 people lived in rural areas as opposed to only 515,599 in urban areas.

Industrial zones
According to the Governing Authority for Investment and Free Zones (GAFI) the governorate is home to two industrial zones.

Demographics
The governorate's area is 1.029 km² or about 5% of the Delta's area, and about 1% of the area of Egypt. The inhabited area is about 589.2 km². Its population – according to a 1999 census – was 953,430. The average rate of population growth is 2.09% per year.

Administrative divisions
The governorate consists of 4 subdivisions, 10 cities, 35 local village units, 59 villages and 722 sub-villages. The subdivisions are Damietta, Faraskur, El Zarqa and Kafr Saad. The governorate includes 7 colleges and institutes, 19 professional training centers, and 657 pre-college schools.

See also

Battle of Mansurah (1250)
Battle of Fariskur (1250)
Damietta
Damietta Port
El Rahamnah
Ras El Bar
Siege of Damietta (1218)
Siege of Damietta (1249)
Ezbet El Borg
El Zarqa

References

External links
Damietta Governorate  official website
 El Watan News of Damietta  

 
Governorates of Egypt
Nile Delta